I&M Bank Kenya Limited, is a commercial bank in Kenya, the largest economy in the East African Community. It is licensed by the Central Bank of Kenya, the central bank and national banking regulator.

Overview
 As of September 2019, the bank's total assets were valued in excess of US$2.52 billion (KES: 261 billion), with shareholders' equity of approximately US$424 million (KES: 44 Billion). As of September 2019, the bank was ranked 8th, by total assets, out of the 40 licensed banks in the country, at that time. I&M Bank serves the banking needs of large and small business customers with emphasis on large and medium-sized corporations as well as individuals with emphasis on premium customers I&M also moved to Tier I after takeover of Giro Bank.

History
The bank traces its history to 1974 when Investments & Mortgages Limited was formed as a private company providing personalised financial services to business people in the Nairobi area. In 1980, I&M, as the company was known at that time, was registered as a Financial Institution under the Banking Act. Following changes in the regulations of the Central Bank of Kenya, the banking regulator in the country, I&M became a commercial bank in 1996.

In 2002, a 16-storey glass and steel skyscraper known as the I&M Bank Tower, was opened on Kenyatta Avenue, in Nairobi's central business district. The following year, I&M Bank acquired Biashara Bank of Kenya Limited, expanding I&M's branch network, client base and assets under management.

In 2007 DEG and PROPARCO, two International development financial institutions, invested approximately US$4.5 million to acquire 11.96 percent shareholding in I&M Bank. That shareholding was later increased to 19.7 percent.

In 2008, I&M Bank acquired a 50 percent ownership in First City Bank Limited (FCB) of Mauritius. FCB has since rebranded itself as Bank One Mauritius. In 2010, I&M Bank acquired a controlling shareholding in CF Union Bank of Tanzania. CF Union Bank has since rebranded into I&M Bank (Tanzania).

In July 2012, I&M Bank Group took a controlling interest in Commercial Bank of Rwanda (BCR), the second-largest commercial bank in the country at the time, for an undisclosed sum of money.

In August 2013, BCR rebranded to I&M Bank Rwanda.

In 2013, I&M Bank created I&M Holdings Limited, as the holding company of all the group's businesses and subsidiaries. The holding company's shares of stock are listed and publicly traded on the Nairobi Securities Exchange, under the symbol I&M.

In 2020, 1 Park Avenue was opened as I&M Banks's new headquarter. The building is located at the Junction of 1st Parklands Avenue and Limuru Road in Nairobi.

Acquisition
In September 2015, I&M Holdings began the process of acquiring Giro Commercial Bank and the merging of its business with that of I&M Bank Limited. The process, which required regulatory approval, was concluded in February 2017, with Giro Commercial Bank surrendering its banking license and becoming part of I&M Bank Kenya.

Branch network
, the bank maintained a network of 40 branches in Kenya, at the following locations. Each branch has an on-site ATM.

 Kenyatta Avenue Branch – I&M Bank Tower, Kenyatta Avenue, Nairobi
 Karen Branch – Karen Office Park, Langata Road, Karen, Nairobi
 2nd Ngong Avenue Branch – I&M Bank House, 2nd Ngong Avenue, Nairobi 
 Sarit Centre Branch – 1st Floor, Sarit Centre, Westlands, Nairobi
 Biashara Street Branch – Ansh Plaza, Biashara Street, Nairobi  
 Industrial Area Branch – KCC Building, Changamwe Road, Nairobi
 Langata Link Branch – Langata Link Complex, Langata South Road, Nairobi 
 Valley Arcade Branch – Kenol Kobil Station, Gitanga Road, Nairobi  
 Panari Sky Centre Branch – Nairobi-Mombasa Road, Nairobi 
 One Park Branch – 1 Park Avenue, Ground Floor (Junction of 1st Parklands and Limuru Road)
 Wilson Airport Branch – Pewin House, Wilson Airport, Nairobi
 Ongata Rongai Branch – First Floor, Maasai Mall, Ongata Rongai, Nairobi
 South C Branch – South C Shopping Centre, Nairobi 
 Riverside Drive Branch -14 Riverside Drive, Nairobi
 Nyali Complex Branch – Nyali Cinemax, Main Nyali Road, Mombasa
 Mombasa Branch – Biashara Building, Nyerere Road, Mombasa 
 Kisumu Branch – Bon Accord House, Oginga Odinga Street, Kisumu
 Nakuru Branch – Polo Centre, Kenyatta Avenue, Nakuru
 Eldoret Branch – Ground Floor, Zion Mall, Uganda Road, Eldoret
 Changamwe Branch – First Floor, Refinery Building, Refinery Road, Mombasa
 Kisii Branch – Royal Tower, Hospital Road, Kisii
 Malindi Branch – First Floor, Pine Court Building, Lamu Road, Malindi 
 Nyeri Branch – Ground Floor, Hopewell Place, Gakere Road, Nyeri
 Thika Branch – Ground Floor, 80 West Place, Opposite Tuskys Supermarket, Thika
 Village Market Branch – Village Market Shopping Complex - New Wing, 1st Floor, Limuru Road
 Sarit Centre Select Branch – Sarit Centre New Wing, Lower Ground Floor, Westlands
 Lavington Mall Branch – First Floor, Lavington Mall, off James Gichuru Road, Nairobi  
 Kitale Branch – Ground Floor, Mega Centre Mall, Kitale
 Lunga Lunga Branch – First Floor, Lunga Lunga Mall, Lunga Lunga Road, Industrial Area, Nairobi
 Yaya Centre Branch – Fourth Floor, Yaya Centre, Argwings Kodhek Road, Nairobi
 Gateway Mall Branch – Gateway Mall, Mombasa Road, opposite Syokimao Railway Station, Nairobi.
 Garden City Mall Branch – Garden City Mall, Thika Road, Nairobi 
 Nanyuki Branch – Ground Floor, Hussein Building, Nanyuki
 Cross Road Branch – Off River Road, Nairobi
 Meru Branch – Ground Floor, P&K Plaza, Moi Avenue, Meru
 Eldama Park Branch – Eldama Park, Nairobi
 Dunga Road Branch – Dunga Road, Industrial Area, Nairobi
 Ridge Court Branch – Ridge Court, Parklands, Nairobi
 Haile Selassie Branch – Patel Samaj Building, Haile Selassie Avenue, Mombasa
 Spring Valley Branch – Ground Floor, Block B, Spring Valley Business Park, Nairobi.

See also

I&M Bank Tower
Economy of Kenya
List of banks in Kenya

References

External links
Tanzania: Dar es Salaam Bank Stake Acquired

Banks of Kenya
Banks established in 1974
Companies based in Nairobi
Kenyan companies established in 1974
I&M Bank Group